The Niigata Kinen (Japanese 新潟記念) is a Grade 3 horse race for Thoroughbreds aged three and over, run in late August or early September over a distance of 2000 metres on turf at Niigata Racecourse.

The Niigata Kinen was first run in 1965 and has held Grade 3 status since 1984. It was run at Nakayama Racecourse in 1996 and 2000.

Winners since 2000

Earlier winners

 1984 - Dyna Mine
 1985 - Russian Blue
 1986 - Blacksky
 1987 - Dyna Fairy
 1988 - Dyna Orange
 1989 - Hardy God
 1990 - Safari Olive
 1991 - Sengoku Hisei
 1992 - Tanino Bolero
 1993 - Brown Beetle
 1994 - Inter Spur
 1995 - Irish Dance
 1996 - Tokai Taro
 1997 - Pal Bright
 1998 - Offside Trap
 1999 - Brilliant Road

See also
 Horse racing in Japan
 List of Japanese flat horse races

References

Turf races in Japan